Javier Antonio Payeras (b. Guatemala City, 6 February 1974) is a Guatemalan poet, novelist, and essayist.

Biography
Central American writer (Guatemala 1974). He is one of the writers who emerged after the Guatemalan Civil War as part of the so-called postwar generation. From 1998, he joined an emerging movement called Casa Bizarra, a project of young artists from the post-conflict generation. A tireless promoter of culture, he was coordinator of the Festival Octubreazul in 2000, director of the Contemporary Art Foundation Colloquia, and curator of Project Crea.

Published works
 Fondo para un disco de John Zorn (poetry, 2013)
 Soledadbrother (stage adaptation by Luis Carlos Pineda and Josué Sotomayor) Centro Cultural de Spain in Guatemala and Catafixia Editorial (2013
 Imágenes para un View-Master (fiction, 2003, 2010)
 Soledadbrother (poetry, 2003, 2010)
 Ruido de Fondo (fiction, 2003, 2006) 
 Afuera (fiction, 2006)
 Las palabras que luego abandonamos (poetry, 2007)
 Lecturas menores (reviews and literary essays, 2008)
 Dos de sal Gema / Relatos autodidactas (poetry and narrative, 2008)
 Días Amarillos (novel, 2009)
 Post-its de luz sucia (poetry, 2009)
 La resignación y la asfixia (poetry, 2011)
 (...) y otros relatos breves (short stories, 2000, 2012)
 limbo (fiction, 2011)
 Déjate caer (poetry, 2012)
 Raktas (fiction, 2000, 2013)

External links
http://javierpayeras.blogspot.com/2015/01/again-i-write-to-you.html
http://soledadbrother.blogspot.com/
http://www.literaturaguatemalteca.org/jpayeras.htm

References 

1974 births
Living people
Guatemalan essayists
Male essayists
Guatemalan novelists
Male novelists
21st-century Guatemalan poets
21st-century male writers
Guatemalan male poets
21st-century essayists